This is a list of United States ambassadors, or lower-ranking diplomatic heads, to Kuwait.

Ambassadors
 Dayton S. Mak (1961–1962) – Chargé d'Affaires
 Parker T. Hart (1962–1963) – First ambassador
 Howard Rex Cottam (1963–1969)
 John Patrick Walsh (1969–1971)
 William A. Stoltzfus, Jr. (1972–1976)
 Frank E. Maestrone (1976–1979)
 Francois M. Dickman (1979–1983)
 Philip J. Griffin (1983–1984) – Chargé d'Affaires
 Anthony Cecil Eden Quainton (1984–1987)
 W. Nathaniel Howell (1987–1991) – left occupied Kuwait in December during DESERT SHIELD before the start of the First Gulf War
 Edward William Gnehm, Jr. (1991–1994) – reopened the embassy following the liberation of Kuwait, February 1991
 Ryan Clark Crocker (1994–1997)
 James A. Larocco (1997–2001)
 Richard Jones (2001–2004)
 Richard LeBaron (2004–2007)
 Deborah K. Jones (2008–2011)
 Matthew H. Tueller (2011–2014)
 Michael J. Adler (May–August 2014) – Chargé d'Affaires, a.i.
 Douglas Silliman (August 2014–August 2016 )
 Lawrence R. Silverman (September 2016–2019)
 Larry L. Memmott became Deputy Chief of Mission at the Embassy in Kuwait on September 10, 2018, and took over leadership of Embassy Kuwait as Chargé d’affaires a.i. on October 5, 2019.
 Alina Romanowski (February 2020–April 2022)

See also
Kuwait – United States relations
Foreign relations of Kuwait
Ambassadors of the United States

References

Citations

Sources 

 United States Department of State: Background notes on Kuwait

External links
 United States Department of State: Chiefs of Mission for Kuwait
 United States Department of State: Kuwait
 United States Embassy in Safat

Kuwait

United States